Spatalla argentea, the silver-leaf spoon, is a flower-bearing shrub that belongs to the genus Spatalla and forms part of the fynbos. The plant is native to the Western Cape, South Africa.

Description
The plant is destroyed in a fire but the seeds survive. The plant is bisexual and pollinated by insects. The fruit ripens two months after the plant has flowered, and the seeds fall to the ground where they are spread by ants.

Distribution and habitat
The plant occurs in the Riviersonderend Mountains from Wolfieskop to Jonaskop. It grows in sandy soil between rocks at altitudes of

References

External links
Threatened Species Programme | SANBI Red List of South African Plants
Spatalla argentea (Silver-leaf spoon)
Woolly Triplespoon
Spatalla argentea Rourke 1969 bl 65

argentea
Fynbos